Red & White Corporation is a chain of independently owned and operated food stores operating in the United States and Canada. While it has been supplanted by supermarket chains in many of its locations, its signature red dot logo with the words Red & White can still be found on small independent grocers in many states & provinces.

Red & White stores were independent grocery stores in small towns. The company did centralized buying and distribution for the small stores to allow them to compete against large chains that were consolidating their power in the 1920s. All members of this group had the words Red & White as part of their names, usually with the owner's name or town name as well.  The firm started around 1925.

The corporation Red & White, headquartered in Chicago, procured branded products for the independent grocery stores. The headquarters were located at the Mercantile Exchange Building at 308 West Washington Street in the present day Chicago Loop. While in Canada, since the 1940s, the Red and White network of stores has been managed by food wholesaler Western Grocers, a division of Loblaws Inc.

References

Food markets in the United States